"Beautiful" is a hip hop song by American rapper Snoop Dogg featuring vocals from fellow American musicians Pharrell Williams and Uncle Charlie Wilson. It was released on January 21, 2003, as the second single from the former's sixth studio album. The song was written by Snoop Dogg alongside producers The Neptunes (Williams and Chad Hugo). The music video was filmed in Rio de Janeiro, Brazil.

The song reached number six on the Billboard Hot 100 and number two on the Rap Songs chart; it was also successful in other countries such as Australia and New Zealand, where it peaked at number four.

Music video

It was directed by Chris Robinson of Partizan Entertainment, was produced by Karen Gainer and the production manager was Renata Chuquer. It reached the 6th spot on the LAUNCH Music Videos Top 100.

The first video set took place in Escadaria Selarón, Lapa district, Rio de Janeiro. The Brazil-colored yellow-green-blue stairways were fabricated by Selaron who started to upgrade the 125 metre, 215-step upwards street in 1990 and it had not been finished until the very day of the shooting. This stairway links the Rua Joaquim Silva in Lapa to the Rua Pinto Martins in Santa Teresa.

The second one is in Parque Lage in the grounds of a 1920s mansion between the Lagoa and the Botanic Gardens, at the base of the Corcovado.  The scene features Brazilian actress/model, Michelle Martins as Snoop Dogg's love affair.  Snoop is surrounded by a group of drummers, who play a long drum interlude that is unincluded in any radio, album or explicit edit of the song.

The third scene is on the Copacabana where Snoop is surrounded by the massive crowd of his fans in one of the segments while in another he and his friends are leaning on to his car and observing the local girls passing by.

During the video, Snoop Dogg wears a #31 Priest Holmes Chiefs jersey and a Lance Alworth jersey number 19.

Track listing
CD single
"Beautiful" (Radio Edit) (featuring Pharrell) — 4:04
"Beautiful" (Instrumental) — 4:21
"Ballin'" (Clean Version) (featuring The Dramatics, Lil' Half Dead) — 5:19
"Beautiful" (Vídeo) (Directed By Chris Robinson) — 5:27

Personnel
Produced by The Neptunes.
Recorded by Andrew Coleman.
Mixed by Pat Viala for Pat 'em Down Music
Written by C. Broadus, P. Williams, C. Hugo
Published by Chad Chase Music/EMI-Blackwood Music (ASCAP)/Waters of Nazareth Publishing/EMI-Blackwood Music (BMI); My Own Chit Music/EMI Blackwood Inc. (BMI)
Pharrell appears courtesy of Virgin Records

Awards
Grammy

Other

Nominated for
2004 MVPA Video Awards
Best Hip-Hop Video
2003 MTV Video Music Awards
Best Hip-Hop Video
2003 Vibe Awards
Reelest Video
Hottest Hook
Coolest Collaboration

Remixes
A solo remix with Charlie Wilson was a part of Snoop Dogg's Welcome 2 tha Chuuuch Mixtape Vol. 5.
A remix with 50 Cent and Lloyd Banks can be found on G-Unit Radio Pt. 1: Smokin' Day 2.
A freestyle used by Rick Ross to Atlanta rapper T.I. It can be found on YouTube.

Charts

Weekly charts

Year-end charts

Certifications

Release history

See also 
 List of Billboard Hot 100 top 10 singles in 2003

References

2003 singles
Charlie Wilson (singer) songs
Snoop Dogg songs
Music videos directed by Chris Robinson (director)
Pharrell Williams songs
Song recordings produced by the Neptunes
Songs written by Pharrell Williams
Songs written by Chad Hugo
Songs written by Snoop Dogg
2002 songs
Priority Records singles
Capitol Records singles